Barry James Cowdrill (born 3 January 1957) is an English former footballer, whose playing position was defender.

Biography
Born in Birmingham, Cowdrill began his career at West Bromwich Albion, where he signed his first professional contract in 1979. He spent ten years with the club, including a loan spell at Rotherham United in 1985, before joining Bolton Wanderers in 1988. He finished his career with Rochdale in 1992.

Honours

Player
1989 Associate Members' Cup

References

1957 births
English footballers
Association football defenders
West Bromwich Albion F.C. players
Rotherham United F.C. players
Bolton Wanderers F.C. players
Rochdale A.F.C. players
Sutton Coldfield Town F.C. players
Living people